The 1999 California Golden Bears football team was an American football team that represented the University of California, Berkeley in the Pacific-10 Conference (Pac-10) during the 1999 NCAA Division I-A football season. In their third year under head coach Tom Holmoe, the Golden Bears compiled a 4–7 record (3–5 against Pac-10 opponents), finished in a tie for sixth place in the Pac-10, and were outscored by their opponents by a combined score of 254 to 180.

Cal was forced to vacate all four wins of the 1999 season for altering the grades of two players.

The team's statistical leaders included Kyle Boller with 1,303 passing yards, Joe Igber with 694 rushing yards, and Michael Ainsworth with 499 receiving yards.

Schedule

Game summaries

USC

Roster

References

California
California Golden Bears football seasons
California Golden Bears football